Mal/4: Trio is an album by American jazz pianist Mal Waldron recorded in 1958 and released on the New Jazz label.

Reception
The AllMusic review by Scott Yanow awarded the album 4½ stars stating "His sometimes-brooding style was already quite recognizable and his inventive use of repetition was quite impressive. This recording gives listeners a definitive look at the early style of Mal Waldron".

Track listing
All compositions by Mal Waldron except as indicated
 "Splidium-Dow" – 5:20
 "Like Someone in Love" (Johnny Burke, Jimmy Van Heusen) – 7:12
 "Get Happy" (Harold Arlen, Ted Koehler) – 4:52
 "J.M.'s Dream Doll" – 4:18
 "Too Close for Comfort" (Jerry Bock, Larry Holofcener, George David Weiss) – 11:27
 "By Myself" (Howard Dietz, Arthur Schwartz) – 4:58
 "Love Span" – 5:11
Recorded at Rudy Van Gelder Studio in Hackensack, New Jersey on September 26, 1958.

Personnel
 Mal Waldron – piano
 Addison Farmer – bass
 Kenny Dennis – drums

References

New Jazz Records albums
Mal Waldron albums
1958 albums
Albums recorded at Van Gelder Studio